The 2002 Chatham Cup was the 75th annual nationwide knockout football competition in New Zealand.

Up to the last 16 of the competition, the cup was run in three regions (northern, central, and southern), with an open draw from the quarter-finals on. The competition comprised a preliminary round and four rounds proper followed by quarter-finals, semi-finals, and a final. The competition was held considerably earlier in the year than normal, with the final being held in July rather than September. In all, 136 teams took part in the competition.

The nine eligible National League clubs entered the tournament at the third round stage. One National League side, Canterbury United, was ineligible, as it was an amalgamated team formed from several clubs within the Canterbury region, each of which competed in the Chatham Cup individually.

The 2002 final

Napier City Rovers took the final 2-0 over Tauranga City United.

The Jack Batty Memorial Cup is awarded to the player adjudged to have made to most positive impact in the Chatham Cup final. The winner of the 2002 Jack Batty Memorial Cup was Leon Birnie of Napier City Rovers.

Results

Second round

* Won on penalties by East Coast Bays (2-1), Melville United (4-2), Mount Albert-Ponsonby (6-5), New Brighton (3-1), and Wellington Marist (4-3)

Third round

Fourth round

† Caversham disqualified for fielding an ineligible player.

Quarter-finals

Semi-finals

Final

References

Rec.Sport.Soccer Statistics Foundation New Zealand 2002 page
UltimateNZSoccer website 2002 Chatham Cup page

Chatham Cup
Chatham Cup
Chatham Cup
July 2002 sports events in New Zealand